Katrina Adams and Zina Garrison-Jackson were the defending champions but lost in the semifinals to Gigi Fernández and Natasha Zvereva.

Fernández and Zvereva won in the final 6–3, 3–6, 6–4 against Manon Bollegraf and Martina Navratilova.

Seeds
Champion seeds are indicated in bold text while text in italics indicates the round in which those seeds were eliminated.

 Gigi Fernández /  Natasha Zvereva (champions)
 Lori McNeil /  Helena Suková (semifinals)
 Katrina Adams /  Zina Garrison-Jackson (semifinals)
 Manon Bollegraf /  Martina Navratilova (final)

Draw

External links
 1994 Virginia Slims of Chicago Doubles Draw

Ameritech Cup
1994 WTA Tour